Macaroni Point is a point marking the northeastern extremity of Deception Island, in the South Shetland Islands, Antarctica. The name arose following survey by the Falkland Islands Dependencies Survey in January 1954, because a colony of macaroni penguins (Eudyptes chrysolophus) is on this point.

References

Headlands of the South Shetland Islands
Geography of Deception Island